Bedin is a surname. Notable people with the surname include:

Camille Bedin (1893–1979), French politician
Gianfranco Bedin (born 1945), Italian footballer
Maurizio Bedin (born 1979), Italian footballer

Bedin may also refer to the galaxy Bedin I, a dwarf spheroidal galaxy.